Husson may refer to:

 Husson (surname), including a list of people with the name
 Husson University, Bangor, Maine, U.S.
 Husson (commune), in the Manche department, France

See also
 Le Rosier de Madame Husson, a novella by Guy de Maupassant
 Husson's yellow bat
 Hussong, a German surname